John J. Hulme (6 February 1945 – 26 May 2008) was an English professional football player and manager.

Career
Born in Mobberley, Hulme played in the Football League as a central defender for Bolton Wanderers, Notts County, Reading and Bury, before moving to Switzerland to become player-manager of FC La Chaux-de-Fonds.

He died on 26 May 2008, at the age of 63, from pancreatic cancer.

References

1945 births
2008 deaths
English footballers
English football managers
Bolton Wanderers F.C. players
Notts County F.C. players
Reading F.C. players
Bury F.C. players
FC La Chaux-de-Fonds players
English Football League players
FC La Chaux-de-Fonds managers
Association football central defenders